Virginia's 57th House of Delegates district elects one of 100 seats in the Virginia House of Delegates, the lower house of the state's bicameral legislature. District 57, consisting of parts of Charlottesville and Albemarle County, has been represented by Sally Hudson since 2020, and previously by David Toscano from 2006 to 2020, following the 2005 election in which he defeated Thomas W. McCrystal after the retirement of Mitchell Van Yahres.

District officeholders

Electoral history

References

External links
 

Virginia House of Delegates districts
Charlottesville, Virginia
Albemarle County, Virginia